Warton with Lindeth was a civil parish and township in the north of Lancashire, England, from 1866 to 1935.

In John Marius Wilson's Imperial Gazetteer of England and Wales (1870–72), Lindeth was described as "a hamlet in Warton parish, Lancashire; 4 ½ miles NW of Carnforth".

References

Former civil parishes in Lancashire